Clanwilliam F.C. is the sixth oldest rugby union club in Ireland. The club is based in Tipperary Town, County Tipperary. Alan Quinlan, John Lacey and Tommy O'Donnell have come through the club.

History 
Clanwilliam Football Club were founded in 1879, making them the sixth oldest rugby club in Ireland. It is not known why they were founded however, it is speculated that it was to capitalise on the popularity of rugby at The Abbey School. It is also speculated that the growth of rugby in the area through the school and Clanwilliam led to a resurgence in gaelic football leading to the eventual foundation of the Gaelic Athletic Association in nearby Thurles. The club lived a nomadic existence until 1956 when they moved to Clanwilliam Park and later opened a second team pitch at Collegelands, County Tipperary. Clanwilliam Park has been used as the venue for the Munster Schools Junior Cup. In 1947, the club won the Munster Junior Cup. They also won the Munster Challenge Cup in 1996. The future Munster Rugby and Ireland national rugby union team player Alan Quinlan started his career at Clanwilliam prior to rugby union permitting professionalism.

In 2018, the Irish Wheelchair Association in County Tipperary required additional funding, Clanwilliam took it upon themselves to raise €112,000 for the charity. In 2019, Clanwilliam received €16,973 from the Government of Ireland in a Sports Capital Grant to improved their rugby posts, showers and security fencing.

References

External links
 Official Website

Irish rugby union teams
Rugby union clubs in County Tipperary